Sonic Dynamite is the seventh album by German band Pink Cream 69.

Track listing

Personnel
David Readman - vocals
Alfred Koffler - guitar
Dennis Ward - bass
Kosta Zafiriou - drums

Guest Musicians
Günther Werno - keyboards in "Passage to Hope", "The Spirit", "Let the Thunder Reside" and "Spread Your Wings".

References

2000 albums
Pink Cream 69 albums
Massacre Records albums
Albums produced by Dennis Ward (musician)